Farhad Salaripour (born 29 January 1987) is an Iranian professional football player currently playing for Fajr Sepasi in the Azadegan League.

Career
Salaripour has played for Mes Kerman F.C. since 2009.

References

External sources
 Profile at Persianleague

Living people
Iranian footballers
Sanat Mes Kerman F.C. players
1987 births
Association football defenders